Phyllodesmium orientale is a species of small sea slug, an aolid nudibranch, a marine gastropod mollusk in the family Facelinidae.

References

Facelinidae
Gastropods described in 1991